Frank Robert Selvag (born May 12, 1989) is a Norwegian bowling player living in the city Trondheim and have played for Trønderstrike Bowlingklubb since 2018.

He started his bowling career when he was 14 years old in the small city Orkanger just an hour south of Trondheim. In 2006 he went from Orkla Bowlingklubb to Trondheim Bowlingklubb but changed back to his farmer club 3 years later.

In the middle of the 2011/12 season he went for a shocking transfer to the rival club Munken Bowlingklubb and in the summer of 2018 he moved on to Trønderstrike Bowlingklubb.

He didn't play much during the 2013/14 season when his club became national champions and national league winners but he qualified to get medals. The season before and after he achieved silver medals with his club in the national league.

In September 2015 he got injury in his left knee but it wasn't until March next year the doctors found out his ligament was 60% ripped off. He took a risk playing Malta Open Championship 3 months later despite the doctor told him not to. In late September 2016 he tried to bowl again but after just 1 game he decided to take it slower in rebuilding himself.

Late 2019 he broke his thumb and were forced to switch to 2-handed style. 

He has played tournaments all around Europe since 2013 in countries like Romania, Czech Republic, Malta and more.

Personal records

References 

1989 births
Living people
Norwegian ten-pin bowling players
Sportspeople from Trondheim